Mustafa Aşan (born 11 September 1988) is a Turkish footballer who plays as a midfielder for Karşıyaka. He made his Süper Lig debut on 17 August 2012.

References

External links
 Mustafa Aşan at goal.com
 
 

1988 births
Living people
Sportspeople from Diyarbakır
Turkish footballers
Turkey youth international footballers
Akhisarspor footballers
Süper Lig players
Association football midfielders
TFF First League players